Dixon is a village in Dixon County, Nebraska, United States. It is part of the Sioux City, IA–NE–SD Metropolitan Statistical Area. The population was 87 at the 2010 census.

History
Dixon was platted in 1890 by the railroad. It took its name from Dixon County, which was named for a pioneer settler. Dixon was incorporated as a village in 1893.

Geography
Dixon is located at  (42.416348, -96.995734).

Demographics

2010 census
At the 2010 census there were 87 people, 39 households, and 23 families in the village. The racial makeup of the village was 98.9% White and 1.1% Native American.
Of the 39 households 23.1% had children under the age of 18 living with them, 43.6% were married couples living together, 10.3% had a female householder with no husband present, 5.1% had a male householder with no wife present, and 41.0% were non-families. 41.0% of households were one person and 25.6% were one person aged 65 or older. The average household size was 2.23 and the average family size was 3.04.

The median age in the village was 51.3 years. 19.5% of residents were under the age of 18; 5.8% were between the ages of 18 and 24; 19.4% were from 25 to 44; 28.6% were from 45 to 64; and 26.4% were 65 or older. The gender makeup of the village was 46.0% male and 54.0% female.

2000 census
At the 2000 census there were 108 people, 49 households, and 31 families in the village. The racial makeup of the village was 93.52% White, 6.48% from other races. Hispanic or Latino of any race were 9.26%.

Of the 49 households 22.4% had children under the age of 18 living with them, 53.1% were married couples living together, 10.2% had a female householder with no husband present, and 36.7% were non-families. 36.7% of households were one person and 22.4% were one person aged 65 or older. The average household size was 2.20 and the average family size was 2.81.

The age distribution was 23.1% under the age of 18, 4.6% from 18 to 24, 21.3% from 25 to 44, 23.1% from 45 to 64, and 27.8% 65 or older. The median age was 46 years. For every 100 females, there were 107.7 males. For every 100 females age 18 and over, there were 88.6 males.

The median household income was $27,188, and the median family income  was $35,625. Males had a median income of $28,750 versus $11,250 for females. The per capita income for the village was $12,870. There were 9.7% of families and 20.2% of the population living below the poverty line, including 51.5% of under eighteens and 5.9% of those over 64.

References

Villages in Dixon County, Nebraska
Villages in Nebraska
Sioux City metropolitan area